Kashchenko is a Ukrainian-language surname. Notable people with the surname include:

Adrian Kashchenko (1858–1921), Ukrainian historian
Pyotr Kashchenko, Russian psychiatrist
Svitlana Kashchenko (born 1968), Russian-Nicaraguan sport-shooter

See also
 

Ukrainian-language surnames